Carlos Alberto Guimarães Filho (born 27 February 1996), commonly known as Jacó, is a Brazilian professional footballer who plays for Masfout as a striker.

Club career

Goiás
On 4 April 2018, Jacó signed with Série B side Goiás. That year, he made seven appearances in Série B and one start in the Copa do Brasil against Grêmio. He also made five appearances and scored one goal at the U23 level for Goiás in the Campeonato Brasileiro de Aspirantes.

Loan to Juazeirense
At the beginning of 2019, Jacó went on loan with Série D side Juazeirense. He made five appearances in the Campeonato Baiano and appeared in one Copa do Brazil match against Vasco da Gama.

Loan to Serra Macaense
In May 2019, Jacó was loaned to Campeonato Carioca Série B1 side Serra Macaense. He scored four goals in fourteen appearances in league play for Macaense and made two appearances in the Copa Rio.

Iporá
On 19 January 2020, Jacó signed with Campeonato Goiano side Iporá. That season, he scored one goal in eight appearances.

York9
On 4 March 2020, Jacó signed with Canadian Premier League side York9. On 27 July, Jacó and York9 agreed to the mutual termination of his contract as he was unable to travel to Canada due to the COVID-19 pandemic.

Grêmio Anápolis
On 3 December 2020, Jacó signed with Campeonato Goiano side Grêmio Anápolis.

Career statistics

References

External links

Jacó at ZeroZero

1996 births
Living people
Association football forwards
Brazilian footballers
People from Campos dos Goytacazes
Brazilian expatriate footballers
Esporte Clube Bahia players
Fluminense de Feira Futebol Clube players
Centro Sportivo Alagoano players
FC Oborishte players
Associação Atlética Anapolina players
Goiás Esporte Clube players
Sociedade Desportiva Juazeirense players
York United FC players
Grêmio Esportivo Anápolis players
Rio Branco Sport Club players
Masfout Club players
Campeonato Brasileiro Série A players
Campeonato Brasileiro Série B players
Second Professional Football League (Bulgaria) players
Canadian Premier League players
UAE First Division League players
Expatriate footballers in Bulgaria
Expatriate soccer players in Canada
Expatriate footballers in the United Arab Emirates
Brazilian expatriate sportspeople in Bulgaria
Brazilian expatriate sportspeople in Canada
Brazilian expatriate sportspeople in the United Arab Emirates
Sportspeople from Rio de Janeiro (state)